BattleTech: The Crescent Hawk's Inception is a turn-based adventure/role-playing video game released in 1988 by Westwood Associates and based on the BattleTech franchise. It was one of the first commercial ports of the licence, and featured some of the franchise's worlds, institutions, political figures, and weapons, particularly the three-story tall BattleMechs. It was followed by a sequel, BattleTech: The Crescent Hawk's Revenge, though that game featured significantly different gameplay, falling into the real-time tactics genre rather than adventure/role-playing.

Storyline

The player takes the role of Jason Youngblood, a young cadet MechWarrior stationed on Pacifica (also known as Chara III) in the Lyran Commonwealth. Stationed at the Citadel, Jason is learning how to pilot a BattleMech and also to fight with small arms, all the while having to live up to the reputation of his hero father, Jeremiah. During a training session in his 'Mech, the Citadel comes under attack from neighboring star-empire the Draconis Combine, slaying the Palace guard, Jeremiah apparently among them. Barely escaping, Jason is rescued from arrest by Draconis Police by Rex Pearce, a friend and colleague of Jeremiah's and a member of the Crescent Hawks. Together they must find and join up with fellow members of the Crescent Hawks, a special forces company established by Jeremiah and the Archon Katrina working in conjunction with the mercenary unit, the Kell Hounds.

Gameplay
The game is divided into three sections, each with different objectives and gameplay style, but a similar interface. The first section is set at the Citadel, and as a way to get a feel for the engine and the interface the player must complete successively harder training missions in a BattleMech, and may also enroll in lessons in a selection of small arms. As well as giving the player an idea of the theme of the game, this section allows the player to "level up" and earn some C-bills, the staple currency in the BattleTech universe. Unusually, all of the game's plot events occur in-play, having the game start before the story. During one of the training missions, the citadel comes under attack and the game changes.

The second section of the game is much more staple RPG: finding people to join the player's party, finding better weapons, items to advance the plot, and, of course, engaging in or avoiding battles. The game here sees the growing party search Pacifica's towns and cities for the means to open an old Star League era cache of BattleMechs and other equipment Jeremiah seems to have concealed. Navigation around the map is timed to the computer's internal clock, when random encounters with enemy 'Mechs and infantry can occur. The player can choose to manually target his weapons (which introduces the turn based battle system) or can opt for computer-controlled combat. One of the towns is walled (the star port) and requires the 'Mechs to be parked in a Garage, meaning that a 'Mech is not always able to count as protection. Random attacks occur often and cannot always be fled from, and so during this section, keeping the player's 'Mech fully functional and protected becomes both challenging and important. The attackers become stronger if the player gains more 'Mechs, and less strong again if the player loses a 'Mech. C-Bill shortages can become a real problem, especially if the player is using weapons with ammunition like missile racks, or if no party member can perform 'Mech repairs. The final section, which is reached once the means of entry to the cave is discovered, consists of a series of puzzles, requiring a combination of luck and logic.

Although the game data contains info for all of the pre-3050 weaponry found in the table-top games, a very limited catalogue of 'Mechs appear in the actual game.

Reception
Computer Gaming World's review of the game noted it wildly deviated from normal Infocom adventures, concluding, "It's a good game, but definitely for beginning to low intermediate players."

Tony Watson reviewed Battletech, The Crescent Hawk's Inception in Space Gamer/Fantasy Gamer No. 88. Watson commented that "it's a judgement call; while I enjoy playing the game, I like the way it was done more than its subject matter. Fans of the FASA Battletech universe will probably enjoy the game more than most players."

Reviews
Isaac Asimov's Science Fiction Magazine v13 n6 (1989 06)

Notes
Special packages of the game were issued. In these special editions of the game, a special edition of the BattleTech miniature of the Phoenix Hawk LAM (Land-Air Mech) were included.

References

External links
 

BattleTech: The Crescent Hawks' Inception at the BattleTechWiki

1988 video games
Amiga games
Apple II games
Atari ST games
BattleTech games
Commodore 64 games
DOS games
Infocom games
Role-playing video games
Single-player video games
Video games based on miniatures games
Video games developed in the United States
Video games set on fictional planets
Westwood Studios games